F54 may refer to:

 F54 (classification), a disability sport classification for athletics
 HMS Hardy (F54), a British anti-submarine warfare frigate 1953–1984
 Mini F54, a second-generation Mini Clubman automobile 2015–present